The 2002 Purefoods Tender Juicy Hotdogs season was the 15th season of the franchise in the Philippine Basketball Association (PBA).

Draft picks

Transactions

Championship
The Purefoods Tender Juicy Hotdogs celebrated their sixth PBA championship and the first in five years by winning the Governor's Cup title over the Alaska Aces in a seven-game series after losing the first two games. Purefoods' finals victory was the first for the team under the new company owner in San Miguel Corporation. Interim coach Ryan Gregorio won his first title as a mentor.

Roster

Elimination round

Games won

References

Magnolia Hotshots seasons
Purefoods